Anna Skarbek (born 1976) is an Australian businesswoman and former investment banker. In 2009 she became the executive director of ClimateWorks Australia, a non-profit group which develops projects to reduce carbon emissions. Under her directorship, the company was awarded a Eureka Prize in 2010 for developing a "low carbon growth plan" with applications for business. Skarbek studied law and commerce at Monash University before taking a job in Macquarie Bank's natural resources team, with a focus on coal transactions. In 2002 she became a climate change adviser to the Victorian deputy premier, John Thwaites. From 2007 to 2009 she worked as an investment manager at Climate Change Capital in London. Skarbek sits on the Government of South Australia's low-carbon expert panel with former Liberal party politician John Hewson and ANU Professor Frank Jotzo.

Energy 
Skarbek is an advocate for the decarbonisation of Australia's energy supply. In 2014 she wrote:"Australia has more renewable energy options than most countries, and can achieve near-zero carbon electricity through renewables alone, or alternatively could introduce some CCS or nuclear in the mix."Skarbek also commented that for countries to achieve what she terms "deep decarbonisation" by 2050, improvements are required in: advanced energy storage, reliable and affordable carbon capture and storage technology, renewable energy technology, high performance buildings and appliances, zero-emissions vehicles and fossil fuel substitutes for marine and air transport.

Skarbek is a co-author of the Pathways to deep decarbonization 2014 report, published by the Sustainable Development Solutions Network (SDSN) and Institute for Sustainable Development and International Relations (IDDRI).

In September 2015, Skarbek was the second witness to be called before South Australia's Nuclear Fuel Cycle Royal Commission.

References 

Living people
Australian businesspeople
1976 births